Champ Libre is a French publisher founded in 1969 by Gérard Lebovici in Paris. The name is taken from a phrase which means "free field" (the way is clear).

In 1984, after the assassination of Gérard Lebovici, Champ Libre changed its name and became Éditions Gérard Lebovici as an hommage. In 1992, it became Éditions Ivrea.

Champ libre has published George Orwell, Mikhail Bakunin and Guy Debord's complete works, among others.

Gallery

See also 
 Gérard Lebovici
 Guy Debord

External links 
 Official site
 Complete list of books published by Champ Libre on French Wikipedia

Situationist
Mass media in Paris